The Lancaster Cemetery Chapels are the three chapels, each built to serve a different denomination, in the main cemetery of Lancaster, England.  The chapels stand around a central point at the highest part of the cemetery.  They were all built in 1854–55, and were designed by the local architect E. G. Paley.  The chapel to the west of the central point served the Anglicans, that to the east the Non-conformists, and the chapel to the north was for Roman Catholics.

Architecture

All the chapels are constructed in coursed squared sandstone with ashlar dressings.  They have slate roofs, and are in Gothic Revival style.  The western chapel has a cruciform plan, with the entrance porch facing east.  It has angle buttresses and coped gables.  A continuous string course runs round the chapel at the level of the window sills.  The windows in the north and south walls are triple stepped lancets.  In the west gable is a wheel window.  The porch is long, with open arcades along the sides supported by polished granite shafts.  In the gable of the porch is a poppyhead, and on its apex stands a cross finial.  The eastern chapel is a mirror image of the western chapel.  The northern chapel is simpler, having a rectangular plan, with a narrow projection to the north and a porch facing south.  All the windows are lancets.  There are cross finials on the east and west gables.  Each of the chapels is recorded in the National Heritage List for England as a designated Grade II listed building.

See also

 Listed buildings in Lancaster, Lancashire
 List of works by Sharpe and Paley

References

External links
 

Grade II listed buildings in Lancashire
Gothic Revival church buildings in England
Gothic Revival architecture in Lancashire
Churches completed in 1855
E. G. Paley buildings
Buildings and structures in Lancaster, Lancashire
Churches in Lancaster, Lancashire
Chapels in England